Sersi is a fictional character appearing in American comic books published by Marvel Comics. The character is depicted as a member of the Eternals, a race of superhumans. She was also a member of the Avengers and God Squad. Sersi first appeared in the 1976–1978 comic book series The Eternals.

Gemma Chan portrays Sersi in the Marvel Cinematic Universe (MCU) film Eternals (2021).

Publication history
Sersi first appeared in The Eternals #3 (September 1976) as Sersy. Although The Eternals was published by Marvel Comics, it was not treated as part of the Marvel Universe, but rather as a stand-alone series. The characters were later incorporated into the Marvel universe. In the 1980s, she made guest appearances in the series The Avengers and Captain America.

Later, Marvel Comics continuity was retconned so that Sersi was the Greek mythological enchantress Circe, as introduced in Strange Tales #109 (June 1963).

In 1990, Sersi joined the Avengers team, after her fellow Eternal Gilgamesh left the team following an injury. Sersi left the team in 1994.

After Malibu Comics was acquired by Marvel, Sersi and the Black Knight were incorporated into the short-lived Ultraverse imprint along with other Marvel characters.

During the 2006 relaunch of the Eternals, the character was redesigned by Neil Gaiman.

Sersi and the other Eternals returned in Jason Aaron's Avengers. They were then all killed in a story arc involving the Dark Celestials in issue #4.

Fictional character biography

Origins and early history
Sersi is a fourth-generation member of the Eternals, an evolutionary offshoot of the human race. She is the daughter of the Eternals Helios and Perse and was probably born in Olympia, Greece, sometime after the Great Cataclysm that destroyed the continents of Atlantis and Lemuria during an extended ice age known as the Hyborean Age. At a young age, Sersi differed from her fellow Eternals in her desire to live among humans. Sersi first met Captain America, who had travelled back in time, during her time in ancient Mesopotamia. Although Sersi still had the appearance of a child at this time, she was already thousands of years old.

A few thousand years later, Sersi was based in ancient Greece, where she met the poet Homer, who would later write one of the earliest works in Western literature, The Odyssey. The character Circe, who lived on Aeaea, an island in the Aegean Sea, and turned Odysseus' men into pigs, was based on Sersi.

Under the name of Circe, Sersi also imprisoned the imps in Pandora's box in ancient times.

Unlike the majority of her fellow Eternals who stay in hidden cities, Sersi revels in her humanity. Except for the Forgotten One, she has lived amongst humans more than any other Eternal. This includes in various places of historical importance like Nero's Rome and Camelot, the court of King Arthur, where she helped Merlin the magician defeat an impostor who had usurped his position. Sersi also fought alongside Thor in the Viking Siege of Paris, although he was not aware of this. She has been a dancer, actress, stage magician, hedonist and adventurer.

The Marvel Age
In The Eternals #3-5, published in 1976, Sersi battled Deviants in New York City, after which anthropologist Dr. Samuel Holden introduced her to the world at large at New York's City College, along with other Eternals. Sersi became fascinated with the soft-spoken Doctor and began a relationship with him. Although she gives the impression that she would rather be at a party, Sersi turned out to be a staunch ally to the Eternals in their struggles with the Deviants.

Sersi met and became an ally of Thor. She then participated in a battle between the Olympian gods and Eternals. Despite her loyalty to the Eternals, Sersi valued her independence, and she often refused to come to the Eternals' gatherings. During one such instance, Domo of the Eternals sent the Delphan Brothers to bring her to Olympia so that all the Eternals could form the Uni-Mind to debate their future. However, Sersi had decided not to attend, as she would continue doing what she wanted regardless of the outcome. Unbeknown to the Delphan Brothers, two of Sersi's party guests were the Wasp and Starfox, members of the Avengers, who, much to Sersi's delight, actually crashed the party. They came to Olympia as well, where it was revealed that Starfox was the son of A'lars, who was also the Mentor of Titan, brother to Zuras. When the majority of Eternals decided to leave Earth for space, Sersi chose to remain.

At least 13 years later, the Avenger Captain America needed someone with illusion casting or shape-changing abilities for help with a case he was working on. He found Sersi's address on the Avengers' database and decided to ask her for help. Sersi was more than happy to aid "Cap" (she quite fancied him, and was constantly flirting with him, much to his embarrassment), although she told him it would require a favor from him in return  as it turned out, a dinner invitation.

Sersi battled Ghaur alongside the Eternals, Thor, and the West Coast Avengers. Sersi also aided the Avengers in their struggle against the Deviants and the Elder God Set. When her fellow Eternal, the Forgotten One, was injured while serving as an Avenger, the Avengers came to Sersi for help. She travelled into the Negative Zone with the Avengers to find the Eternals, where she was seemingly killed by Blastaar, but returned to life.

Earth's mightiest
Captain America, the chairman of the Avengers, decided to ask Sersi to join the Avengers due to her previous assistance. Sersi accepted Cap's proposal and became one of Earth's mightiest (perhaps based on her attraction to Cap, or because she discovered that she enjoyed heroics more than she let on). In her first mission with the team, she helped them defeat Nebula.

Sersi was a powerful addition to the Avengers roster, although her harmless flirtation still managed to embarrass Captain America. Sersi served with the team for quite a long time. Then, during an attack on the Earth by the Brethren, Sersi was captured and formed a Uni-Mind with the Brethren leader, Thane Ector. Such a union, between two different species, is forbidden by the Eternals, as it may lead to the breakdown of the Eternals' mental disciplines. Sersi fought Sybil Dorn and became an ally to Thane Ector.

Some months after this, Sersi became more aggressive; she was one of the Avengers involved in the attempted murder of the Kree Leader, the Supreme Intelligence, during the Avengers involvement in the Kree-Shi'ar War.

Black Knight's love and Proctor's evil
During this time, Sersi began a relationship with fellow Avenger Dane Whitman, the Black Knight. The Avengers begin a fight against a villain called Proctor, who was reuniting Avengers from different realities, forming a team called "The Gatherers".

The new aggressive nature of Sersi caused tensions between herself and her fellow teammates. A romantic triangle was formed between Sersi, the Black Knight, and  the newest Avenger, Crystal. These tensions came to a climax when the Avengers traveled to the planet Polemachus. When the villainous priest Anskar murdered a young girl called Astra, Sersi killed him in retribution.

When the Avengers returned to Earth, Sersi fled to Warrior Falls, in Wakanda, trying to escape the guilt and the fear she felt due to her rash actions. The Black Knight found her and convinced her to return to Avengers Headquarters. Sersi said to her lover that she feared she was going insane. Upon her return to Avengers Headquarters, Sersi suddenly attacked her fellow Avengers. She was stopped only by the intervention of the Vision (who was secretly the Anti-Vision, a member of the Gatherers). The real Vision was being held prisoner in Proctor's Andean mountain base.

By this time, Sersi's fellow Eternals had become aware of her unstable nature. Three of them came to her: Ikaris, Arex, and Sprite, to return her to Olympia (the Eternal capital). The Eternals feared Sersi was suffering from the Mahd W'yry disease, a breakdown of the mind due to the Eternals extended lives. Sersi rejected their fears as archaic and refused to accompany them back to Olympia. The Avengers also didn't want to let the Eternals take one of their members against her will. They also learned that if Sersi was found to be suffering from the Mahd W'yry, the Eternals planned to 'cleanse' her of it by molecular disintegration, killing her. Sprite, who had learned of Sersi's relations with the Black Knight, proposed that the Knight be made her Gann Josin. (a concept the Eternals use to describe an intimate joining of two minds as soulmates in their own personal Uni-Mind). Before the matter could be further discussed, Ikaris used his powers as the Prime Eternal to create the link between Sersi and The Black Knight. The Eternals then departed. The Black Knight was not happy with the result, for he had decided that he loved Crystal and not Sersi.

The Avengers, had little time to discuss the situation because they assaulted Proctor's Andean citadel. Then they fought against the Kree suicide squad, In the Genoshan conflict, Sersi fought Exodus. The Avengers also venturing into Deviant Lemuria, in a battle against the mad priest Ghaur, an old enemy of Sersi.

The relations between the teammates continued to worsen, and Sersi remained in her unstable state. The Avengers called on former member Hank Pym to discover the cause of her mental problems. At one point, Sersi confided in the Avengers' butler Jarvis that she had been having dreams about a strange man dressed in black, who was assaulting young men she had befriended. Jarvis probed her further, and Sersi used her powers to pull the image of Proctor from her mind. Neither Jarvis nor Sersi had ever seen Proctor and didn't recognize him. Around this time, two police officers questioned Sersi personally. Later, they were found dredged from a river and turned into stone. Sersi was framed for these murders.

Sersi was surprised by this accusation. The Avengers believed her capable of the crimes. When the police attempted to arrest her, Sersi destroyed the Avengers Mansion and fled to the Brooklyn Bridge. In her maddened state, she used the Gann Josin link to call the Black Knight to her side, and the two of them prepared to fight the other Avengers. When Sersi threatened Crystal, the Black Knight reacted and broke the Gann Josin bond temporarily. Shocked by this, Sersi destroyed the Brooklyn Bridge.

Confused with her state of mind, Sersi was finally approached by Proctor, who revealed the full extent of his mad plan. Capturing her, Proctor returned to his base of operations in New York and revealed that it was he who was behind her madness and seizures, and it was he who was responsible for the murders of the young men and the police officers. Now, with her full memory returned, Sersi broke free from Proctor's control long enough to stumble upon the villain's trophy room. Here laid Ute, a defeated Watcher (who Proctor used to traverse the multiverse) as well as innumerable Sersi's of other worlds that Proctor had already killed in his mad crusade. With Sersi confused, the Gatherer Rik was able to contain her once again. The Avengers were rescued by the Eternals Thena and Sprite. Based on the description Jarvis gave to them of the man in Sersi's dream, the Avengers concluded that Proctor was responsible for the crimes. They also were approached by Ute on astral form, who warned them that Proctor should be defeated, or all the reality would collapse. The Dane Whitman meanwhile, discovered by computer analysis that Proctor was a version of himself from a different reality. Proctor meanwhile, began his final gambit: using the life energies of Sersi and Ute to collapse the various realities on one another.

The Avengers were joined by Thena and Sprite, and rushed to the scene, only to be confronted by the Gatherers. While his fellow Avengers fought the various Gatherers, the Black Knight approached Proctor himself, only to be defeated by the Proctor and his Ebony Blade. Sersi and the Watcher looked on from the vortex that contained them as Proctor began to 'gather' the Black Knight's essence into himself, preparing to merge with him. Quicksilver, Crystal's estranged husband, stopped the villain plan. Approaching Proctor, a freed Sersi used the villain's Ebony Blade to kill him. After this, Ute (in his dying breaths) used his powers to undo the damage that had been done to Avengers Mansion, the Brooklyn Bridge, and various other locations, as well as opening a dimensional rift to another reality. Sersi, fearing that the manipulations of Proctor were irreversible, decided to enter this door between worlds, so that she may be able to live free of his madness. With his own mind clear the Black Knight decided to join Sersi in her exile. He felt responsible for the suffering Sersi had endured, and he knew that he couldn't remain in the Avengers if it meant interfering with Quicksilver's attempts to reconcile with Crystal. The two Avengers entered the dimensional rift, traveling to another universe.

Lost in the Ultraverse

The portal brought the duo to the Ultraverse, the home of the ultras (a universe created by Malibu Comics). They were separated in the rift, Sersi ended up in Equatorial Africa, while Dane Whitman, found himself in Miami. In the Ultraverse, Sersi was possessed by the spirit of one of the Infinity Gems, the Ego gem.

The Ego gem had been separated from the others many times, and now intended to use Sersi to be reunited with the others. (the gems had also been transported to the Ultraverse, for the actions of the Ultra supervillain Rune). Sersi's will proved too strong for the Gem, and her bond with the Black Knight caused her to seek him out. The Ego Gem, gave her one day to make peace with her past.

The Black Knight meanwhile, had found the local Ultraforce, the mightiest heroes of the Ultraverse, like Hardcase, Prime, and Topaz. Learning of Loki's control of the Infinity Gems, the Knight attempted to contact the Avengers, but was foiled when Sersi showed up. Sersi intermediately fought with Topaz, an amazonian queen of Gwendor. The intervention of the Black Knight ended the battle. The Ego Gem, realizing that it could use the Ultraforce to reunite with its 'brothers', forced Sersi to send them after the six other Gems. The Black Knight and Ultraforce failed to wrest the Gems from Loki's control. Sersi used her remaining free will to return them to their base.

Now completely, under the Ego Gem's control, Sersi became aware of the Grandmaster's presence in the Ultraverse. This Elder of the Universe had journeyed to the Ultraverse in an attempt to obtain the Mind gem. Realizing the opportunity, the Ego Gem forced the Grandmaster to do its bidding as well. The Grandmaster approached Loki, and proposed a game. If he won, the Grandmaster would be given the Mind Gem. If Loki won, he would be told the location of the Ego Gem. The game was called Worlds and Warriors, a simplified version of an Earth card game. Instead of cards, however, actual heroes would be used. The Grandmaster had chosen the Avengers, while Loki had chosen Ultraforce. Members of each team were pitted against members of the other. The Avengers, for their part, were told it was to stop Loki, and to save the Black Knight, while the members of Ultraforce were told that the Avengers were part of an invading force. The various battles ended in stalemates, and Loki, used claimed victory. The Grandmaster (slave to the Ego Gem's will), revealed Sersi to Loki. She launched herself at him, and was able to separate him from the Gems before he could act. At this time, the Ego Gem released Sersi from its power. Reuniting with the six other Gems, they were rendered entirely sentient, anthropomorphizing into a cosmic being calling itself Nemesis.

Nemesis wanted to create a new world, and (joining elements from both the Avengers and Ultraforce's worlds) created an amalgam universe. There were too many conflicting elements though, and when Topaz of the Ultraverse made physical contact with Loki, elements from two wildly different continua, the structure snapped. In her panic, Nemesis teleported to the Ultra's Earth, and intended to continue creating there, even if it meant the destruction of the world that was there already. The six other Gems were resisting her though, for the being called Nemesis lacked the controlling influence that was needed to unite them. The Avengers and Ultraforce joined forces to stop her. Creating a diversion, they attacked her together, allowing the Black Knight to get close enough to separate the Gems once more. In the resulting explosion, the Avengers were returned to the Marvel Universe Earth, while Ultraforce, and the Black Knight returned to the Ultraverse. Sersi wandered in limbo until the Black Knight returned to her.

Ancient enemies — modern rebirth
In time, however the two Avengers found a way to return to Earth-616, but not before traveling back in time to the era of the Crusades, where they fought the villain Exodus.

The two were separated once more on their return to their correct timeline. The Black Knight found himself in New York, but as the Avengers were dead in the wake of Onslaught, he joined the Heroes for Hire (both fictional group and 1997 limited series title). However, Sersi found herself in Lemuria; upon learning of yet another plot by Ghaur, she escaped to get aid. Also finding the Avengers dead, she turned to the Heroes for Hire. Foiling Ghaur's plot, Sersi and the Black Knight decided that they both needed some time apart after all they had been through.

Sersi returned to Olympia, where she remained until, apart from aiding the Avengers in their battle against Morgana Le Fey, she joined the New Breed, a group of Eternals posing as a human super team to control the Deviants, who became mindless monsters.

The Eternals (2006)

Due to Sprite's attempt to become a human, Sersi lived in New York, where she planned parties for a living. There, she could neither remember her origin as an Eternal nor her powers. She was hired by Druig, currently deputy Prime Minister of Vorozheika, to publicize this small former Soviet republic by organizing a party at the Vorozheikan embassy. After the party was saved from a group of gunmen via the efforts of Mark Curry (who temporarily regained his powers, though means unknown even to him) and Iron Man, Iron Man questioned Sersi about registering, as she was a former Avenger. Sersi is shown to be perplexed by what he means, and Iron Man later is confounded when he finds that there are no longer any records of Sersi in the Avengers database. She tests her powers out and accidentally turns a cat into a dragon.

If the Eternal known as Sprite is to be believed, the Eternals' memories of their history and lives are actually a complex illusion on his part (a possible retcon of the Eternals' origin brought to the fore in this new Comic miniseries), and Sersi is actually much closer to half a million years old rather than "just" at most five thousand years old (she has had the Eternal Makkari as an on-again, off-again lover for hundreds of thousands of years now if Sprite's story is true as stated). By the end of the series, she decides that she wants to resume her normal life, wishing to be neither an Eternal, nor lead the life as an Avenger that is offered to her by Tony Stark.

Now retired from the world of superheroics, Sersi later appears as the head of a party planning website. She declines the Wasp's request to become an Avenger once again, but does use her powers to help the team track down Yon-Rogg.

Death
When the Final Host arrived on Earth, Sersi and all the other Eternals killed themselves after realizing the true purpose for which they were created. Her body was seen when Iron Man and Doctor Strange traveled to the mountains of Greece to get answers from the Eternals.

Powers and abilities
As a member of the race of superhumans known as the Eternals, Sersi has the standard abilities of Earth's Eternals, though she has focused the majority of her power into transmutational abilities and passed it off as illusion or magic over the centuries. Sersi's psionic ability to rearrange the molecular structure of objects is far greater than that of any other Eternal; the limits on Sersi's molecular rearrangement powers are as yet unrevealed, but she once stated that even the Eternals' leader, Zuras, feared her, and Sprite claimed that she was the most powerful of all the Eternals. Sersi is the only living Fifth Level adept at matter transmutation (on a 1-5 scale). She has the ability to alter molecular and atomic structures of all matter including living organisms. However, she has expressed difficulty in rearranging sub-atomic matter.

Reception

Accolades 

 In 2015, Entertainment Weekly ranked Sersi 8th in their "Let's rank every Avenger ever" list.
 In 2018, CBR.com ranked Sersi 8th in their "25 Most Powerful Avengers Ever" list.
 In 2019, CBR.com ranked Sersi 8th in their "15 Most Powerful Eternals" list.
 In 2021, Screen Rant ranked Sersi 5th in their "10 Most Powerful Members Of The Eternals" list.
 In 2021, CBR.com ranked Sersi 4th in their "10 Strongest Characters From Eternals Comics" list.

Other versions
Sersi has many other versions in the multiverse, but many of them were apparently killed by Proctor himself.

Mutant X
In Mutant X, Sersi, along with many other Eternals and Inhumans confront the murderous duo of Dracula and the Beyonder in Washington, D.C. They all perish.

In other media

Television
 Sersi appears in Marvel Knights: Eternals, voiced by Kelly Sheridan.

Film
 Sersi appears in Eternals, portrayed by Gemma Chan. Feige described Sersi as the lead of the film.  In the film, Sersi is an empathetic Eternal with an affinity for humankind who can manipulate matter. She has been in love with Ikaris for centuries, and poses as a museum curator on Earth and began a relationship with Dane Whitman. After Ajak's betrayal by Ikaris, she becomes the new Eternal leader. Chan is set to return as Sersi in future MCU films.

Video games 
 Sersi made her video game debut as an unlockable playable character in Marvel Future Fight in March 2021. A Sersi costume, based on the MCU character, was later added during the tie-in event to the release of Eternals in November of the same year.
 Sersi appears as an unlockable playable character in Marvel Contest of Champions.
 Sersi appears as an unlockable playable character in Marvel Super War.
 Sersi appears as an unlockable playable character in Marvel Strike Force.
 Sersi appears as an unlockable playable character in Marvel Puzzle Quest.
 Sersi appears as a companion character in Marvel Future Revolution.

References

External links
 
  Sersi's loft
 Marvel Database Project: Sersi

Avengers (comics) characters
Characters created by Jack Kirby
Characters created by Stan Lee
Circe
Comics characters introduced in 1976
Eternals (comics)
Fictional characters with elemental transmutation abilities
Fictional characters with superhuman durability or invulnerability
Marvel Comics characters who can move at superhuman speeds
Marvel Comics characters who have mental powers
Marvel Comics characters with accelerated healing
Marvel Comics characters with superhuman strength
Marvel Comics martial artists
Marvel Comics telekinetics
Marvel Comics telepaths
Marvel Comics female superheroes
Ultraverse